Pelham is an English surname. Notable people with the surname include:

Surname 
 British aristocratic Whig politicians: 
 Thomas Pelham, 1st Baron Pelham (1653–1712), father of two British Prime Ministers:
 Thomas Pelham-Holles, 1st Duke of Newcastle (1693–1768)
 Henry Pelham (1694–1754)
American artistic family
 Peter Pelham (c. 1695 – 1751), artist
 Peter Pelham (composer) (1721–1805)
 Henry Pelham (engraver) (1748/49–1806)
 William Pelham (bookseller) (1759–1827)
Other people (in alphabetical order)
 Charles Pelham (congressman) (1835–1908), U.S. Representative from Alabama
 Francis Pelham, 5th Earl of Chichester  (1844–1905), British nobleman and amateur cricketer
 Frederick Thomas Pelham (1808–1861), Royal Navy officer and Second Naval Lord
 George F. Pelham (1857–1937), American architect
 John Pelham (bishop) (1811–1894), Bishop of Norwich in 1857–1893
 John Pelham (officer) (1838–1863), Confederate artillery officer during the American Civil War
 Moses Pelham (born 1971), German rapper and musician
 Peregrine Pelham (died 1650), British Member of Parliament
 Richard Pelham (1815–1876), American blackface performer
 Thomas Pelham (disambiguation), various people
 William Pelham (Medal of Honor) (1845/47–1933), American Union Navy sailor, recipient of Medal of Honor
Fictional characters
 Bertie Pelham, a character on the television drama Downton Abbey and its film adaptation

First name 
 Pelham Humfrey (1647–1674), English Baroque composer
 Sir Pelham Warner ("Plum Warner", 1873–1963), English test cricketer
 P. G. von Donop (Pelham George von Donop, 1851–1921), English footballer, soldier and railway inspector, godfather to P. G. Wodehouse
 P. G. Wodehouse (Sir Pelham Grenville Wodehouse, 1881–1975), English author, lyricist, playwright

English-language surnames